Alfredo S. G. Taylor (1872–1947) was an architect, of the New York firm Taylor & Levi, which he co-founded with Julian Clarence Levi.

He was educated at Harvard College, class of 1894, and received his B.S. from Columbia Graduate School of Architecture, Planning and Preservation in 1897.

Many of his works are listed on the U.S. National Register of Historic Places.  At least two, the Starling W. Childs House and the Frederick W. Rockwell House, both in Norfolk, Connecticut, were documented in the U.S. Historic American Buildings Survey.

Hillside (Norfolk, Connecticut), was designed by Taylor for an heiress of the Remington Arms business fortune, and was built in 1908.  It is one of his more "spectacular" houses.

Taylor was the designer of over thirty buildings in Norfolk, Connecticut, in a wide variety of styles, in the four decades before the Second World War.  He designed a lavish summer pavilion in Norfolk's Dennis Hill State Park, of which only remnants survive.

Work
Starling Childs Camp, Doolittle Lake, Norfolk, CT (Taylor, Alfredo S. G.), NRHP-listed
Gould House, Golf Dr., Norfolk, CT (Taylor, Alfredo S. G.), NRHP-listed
Hillside, Litchfield Rd., Norfolk, CT (Taylor, Alfredo S. G.), NRHP-listed
Mead Camp, Doolittle Lake, Norfolk, CT (Taylor, Alfredo S. G.), NRHP-listed
Moss Hill, Litchfield Rd., Norfolk, CT (Taylor, Alfredo S. G.), NRHP-listed
Norfolk Country Club House, Golf Dr., Norfolk, CT (Taylor, Alfredo S. G.), NRHP-listed
Rectory and Church of the Immaculate Conception, North St., Norfolk, CT (Taylor, Alfredo S. G.), NRHP-listed
Rockwell House, Laurel Way, W., Norfolk, CT (Taylor, Alfredo S. G.), NRHP-listed
John Shepard House, Shepard Park Rd., Norfolk, CT (Taylor, Alfredo S. G.), NRHP-listed
Robbins Stoeckel House, Litchfield Rd., Norfolk, CT (Taylor, Alfredo S. G.), NRHP-listed
World War I Memorial, Greenwoods Rd. West and North Sts., Norfolk, CT (Taylor, Alfredo, S. G.), NRHP-listed
Low House (Norfolk, Connecticut), Highfield Rd., Norfolk, CT (Taylor & Levi), NRHP-listed
Moseley House-Farm, Greenwoods Rd., Norfolk, CT (Taylor & Levi), NRHP-listed
Mulville House, Mountain Rd., Norfolk, CT (Taylor & Levi), NRHP-listed
Noble House (Norfolk, Connecticut), Highfield Rd., Norfolk, CT (Taylor & Levi), NRHP-listed
Norfolk Downs Shelter, Gold Rd., Norfolk, CT (Taylor & Levi), NRHP-listed
Sports Building, Windrow Rd., Norfolk, CT (Taylor & Levi), NRHP-listed
Tom Thumb House, Windrow Rd., Norfolk, CT (Taylor & Levi), NRHP-listed

References

Architects from New York (state)
20th-century American architects
1872 births
1947 deaths
People from Norfolk, Connecticut
Harvard College alumni
Columbia Graduate School of Architecture, Planning and Preservation alumni